Lineage Logistics is an international warehousing and logistics management company and an industrial real estate investment trust (REIT) owned by Bay Grove, LLC. Entering international markets in 2017, it grew into the world's largest refrigerated warehousing company,  acquiring, by 2021, 72 other cold-chain storage companies and handling more than eight percent of the global food supply. Lineage operates over 350 facilities with over 17,000 employees in 15 countries across North America, South America, Europe, Asia, Australia and New Zealand.

History
The company was founded in April 2012 by former Morgan Stanley investment bankers Kevin Marchetti and Adam Forste, who formed Bay Grove Capital, LLC, through the consolidation of acquired warehousing and logistics companies beginning, in December 2008, with the purchase of Seafreeze from Toyo Susian Kaisha. The company then acquired CityIce, in 2009, and Flint River Services, in 2010, followed, in 2011, by Terminal Freezers of Santa Maria, California, and Richmond Cold Storage, purchased from Atlanta Equity; founded in 1907 in Richmond, Virginia, the latter then become its earliest predecessor company.

Lineage Logistics was formed with the fifth-largest network of temperature-controlled warehouse facilities in North America, according to International Association of Refrigerated Warehouses (IARW) rankings, with 40 facilities in eight states, including near international ports at Savannah, Georgia, Seattle, Washington and Norfolk, Virginia; warehouse management; consulting; and food processing support.

In 2012, the company acquired Stanford Refrigerated Warehouses and Castle & Cooke Cold Storage; Bill Hendricksen of Castle & Cooke then joined Lineage as CEO. Hendricksen was succeeded by W. Gregory Lehmkuhl, in July 2015. Lineage subsequently moved its headquarters from Irvine, California to Novi, Michigan.

Between 2016 and 2018, Lineage Logistics was granted 15 U.S. patents.

Lineage entered European markets in 2017, acquiring Partner Logistics, a large cold-chain storage supplier. The company then expanded into the temperature-controlled logistics markets in Australia, New Zealand, and Sri Lanka, in November 2019, with the acquisition of Emergent Cold, then into Canada, in July 2020, acquiring Ontario Refrigerated Services Inc.

In 2018, Stonepeak Partners, D1 Capital Partners, and existing backers acquired minority stakes in the company valued at $700 million.

In 2019, Lineage was recognized by Fast Company as one of the world's 50 most innovative companies of 2019, including ranking #1 in its practice of data science. In 2020, Lineage was included on Fortune magazine's annual "Change the World List". In 2021, Lineage was named on the CNBC Disruptor 50 list.   

In a March 2021 interview with Bloomberg, Lineage CEO Greg Lehmkuhl said the company is actively preparing its IPO. In May 2021, Lineage acquired Crystal Creek e-commerce fulfillment logistics operator and its five U.S. warehouses, increasing the company's acquisitions to 72.

In July 2021, Lineage partnered with 8VC logistics technology venture capital firm, to further invest in the transportation and logistics technology sector.

Operations 
In April 2013, the company received a $220 million loan, and acquired Seattle Cold Storage and a University Park, Illinois facility. By 2014, most Lineage customers were food producers requiring cold chain warehousing, transportation, and logistics; to meet demand, the company concentrated on automation and acquisition. In March 2014, the company agreed to purchase Millard Refrigerated Services for about $1 billion, its largest acquisition to date, making Lineage "the second-largest temperature-controlled warehousing and logistics company in the world." Lineage then acquired Loop Cold Storage, Oneida Cold Storage & Warehouse, Murphy Overseas, and two facilities in Watsonville, California from Dreisbach Enterprises and, that September, opened a new temperature-controlled warehouse in Santa Maria, California.

By 2015, Lineage's facility network was ranked the second-largest in the world by the International Association of Refrigerated Warehouses. With 111 facilities in 21 states, Lineage also ranked as the second largest temperature-controlled warehousing and logistics company in the United States. In January 2015, Lineage acquired the Pacific Northwest cold storage facilities of Columbia Colstor, headquartered in Moses Lake, Washington.

In May 2016, the company opened a $150 million temperature-controlled warehouse in North Charleston, South Carolina, near the Port of Charleston, then acquired Consolidated Distribution Corporation of Lombard, Illinois that August, making Lineage the largest customized redistribution network in the United States. Two months later, it was reported that Lineage was considering locating a large facility at New Century AirCenter in Gardner, Kansas. but the proposed location resulted in lawsuits from local residents, and Lineage scrapped the project in November 2017 "due to a change in customer needs", though the project had received unanimous approval from county commissioners in July.

In 2017, Lineage acquired Partner Logistics, a large European cold-chain storage supplier. The company purchased facilities from American Cold Storage, in the Midwest, and eight Los Angeles, California area warehouses from U.S. Growers Cold Storage, raising its employee roster to 7,200, with Lineage operating 120 temperature-controlled storage facilities.7,200 (2018)

In April 2018, Lineage began building its first fully automated North American facility in Sunnyvale, Texas and, in May, announced expansion to its Henderson, Colorado facility.

During 2018, the company acquired 24 companies, including The Yearsley Group, the UK's largest Cold Storage and Haulage supplier, maintaining its second-largest status. The company also sold minority stakes worth $700 million. Company real estate holdings were estimated at $4 billion in value.

On February 25, 2019 The Wall Street Journal reported the company's acquisition of Preferred Freezer Services LLC., its largest competitor, in a deal reportedly worth over $1 billion, expanding Lineage to the world's largest facility network, with 1.3 billion cubic feet of storage in over 200 facilities across the United States, Europe, and Asia.

On May 22, 2020 Lineage Logistics acquired the distribution assets of one of the largest independent Food Distribution companies in the country for over 100 years, Maines Paper & Food, Inc, based in Conklin, New York. That June, the company acquired Emergent Cold, Australia's largest cold-chain supplier, and New Orleans Cold Storage, with four port facilities in New Orleans, Louisiana, Houston, Texas and Charleston, South Carolina.

That July, Lineage acquired Henningsen Cold Storage, based in Portland, Oregon, with 14 cold storage facilities located mainly in Oregon and Washington, raising its employee roster to 16,000.

In September 2020, Lineage raised 1.6 billion in equity for technology and expansion. That year, media reported that about eight percent of the world's food supply was shipped, stored, or processed at over 330 Lineage Logistics facilities comprising 1.9 billion cubic feet of storage, by 16,000 employees in 15 countries across North America, South America, Europe, Asia, Australia and New Zealand, and that "Upwards of 90 percent of refrigerated calories consumed in the U.S. pass through its warehouses."

On December 1, 2020, Lineage acquired Pago, a warehousing, distribution and transport logistics provider in Poland.

In March 2021, Lineage raised a further 1.9 billion in equity for global greenfield developments, facility expansions, M&A and research and development.

In May 2021, Lineage entered the Spanish marketplace, acquiring cold storage firm Frigorificos de Navarra of Gijón, Spain from Frioastur and, in June 2021, entered the European freight industry with its acquisition of Rotterdam-based UTI Forwarding, and also acquired Kloosterboer Group in Europe, and the cold storage division of Claus Sorensen Group in Denmark.

In April 2022, Lineage acquired VersaCold Logistics to expand its presence in Canada. Later in May, the company acquired Mandai Link Logistics to expand into Singapore.

Facilities
Lineage Logistics is headquartered in Novi, Michigan, with offices in San Francisco, California; Irvine, California; Omaha, Nebraska; and Richmond, Virginia. It operates about 223 facilities in North America, including in 35 U.S. states, and warehouses in Australia, Belgium, China, Denmark, the Netherlands, New Zealand, Norway, Peru, Poland, Spain, Sri Lanka, the United Kingdom, and Vietnam. Its distribution centers include services such as blast freezing of perishable goods.

References

Transport companies established in 2012
Logistics companies of the United States
Supply chain management
Transportation companies based in California